Briesen may refer to the following places:

In Brandenburg, Germany 
Briesen (Spreewald), in the Spree-Neiße district
Briesen (Mark), in the Oder-Spree district
A part of Friesack, in the Havelland district
A part of Halbe, in the Dahme-Spreewald district

German alternates
An older name of Brezno, Slovakia
An older name of Brzeźno, Człuchów in Poland
An older name of Wąbrzeźno, Poland
An older name of Brzeżno, Poland

Old district
An old district in West Prussia